The 1998 World Mountain Running Championships was the 14th edition of the global mountain running competition, World Mountain Running Championships, organised by the World Mountain Running Association.

Senior

Individual

Men individual

Women individual

Team

Men

Women

References

External links
 

World Mountain Running Championships
World Long Distance Mountain Running